This is a list of programs broadcast by Teletoon. Télétoon has a different schedule than the English version, although many of the same programs are aired on both channels. For television programs broadcast during their respective nighttime blocks, see Teletoon at Night and Télétoon la nuit. Premiere airdates are provided in parentheses where available.

Current programming
As of March 2023:

Original programming

Acquired from Cartoon Network/Boomerang/HBO Max (U.S.)

Other acquired programming

Reruns of ended programming

Original programming

Acquired programming

Upcoming programming

Original programming

Acquired from Cartoon Network/Boomerang/HBO Max (U.S.)

Former programming

1 Indicates program moved to YTV.
2 Indicates program moved to Family Channel/WildBrainTV.
3 Indicates program moved to Treehouse TV.

Original programming

 A Treasure in My Garden (September 3, 2003)
 The Adventures of Paddington Bear (October 17, 1997)
 The Amazing Spiez! (September 6, 2010)
 Angela Anaconda (October 5, 1999) 
 Animal Crackers (October 17, 1997) 
 Atomic Betty (August 29, 2004)
 Atomic Puppet (September 11, 2016)
 Bad Dog (March 1, 1999) 
 The Bagel and Becky Show (November 14, 2016)
 Bakugan Battle Brawlers (April 5, 2007) 
 Bakugan: Gundalian Invaders (May 23, 2010)
 Bakugan: Mechtanium Surge (February 13, 2011)
 Bakugan: New Vestroia (April 12, 2009)
 The Baskervilles (March 10, 2000) 
 Best Ed (October 3, 2008)
 Blake and Mortimer
 Blaster's Universe (January 4, 2000)
 Braceface (June 2, 2001) 
 Bromwell High (February 1, 2005)
 Caillou3 (October 17, 1997) 
 Camp Lakebottom (July 4, 2013)
 The Care Bears Family (March 2009)
 Carl² (August 7, 2005) 
 Chaotic (March 16, 2007)
 Chop Chop Ninja (October 6, 2018)
 Chop Chop Ninja Challenge (November 24, 2014)
 Chop Socky Chooks (March 16, 2007) 
 Class of the Titans (December 31, 2005)
 Clone High (November 2, 2002) 
 Cracked
 Crash Canyon (September 18, 2011)
 Creepschool (March 13, 2004) 
 Cybersix (September 6, 1999) 
 Daft Planet (September 2, 2002) 
 The Dating Guy (October 17, 2010)
 Delilah & Julius (August 14, 2005)
 Delta State (September 11, 2004) 
 Donkey Kong Country (October 17, 1997) 
 Doodlez (September 6, 2002) 
 Dr. Dimensionpants (November 6, 2014)
 Eckhart (September 8, 2000) 
 Edward (January 23, 2002)
 Endangered Species (March 3, 2015)
 Flight Squad (March 27, 2000)
 Fly Tales (September 6, 1999) 
 Flying Rhino Junior High (October 3, 1998) 
 For Better or For Worse (November 5, 2000) 
 Freaktown (June 20, 2016)
 Fred the Caveman (September 2, 2002) 
 Fred's Head (January 12, 2008) 
 Fugget About It (September 7, 2012) 
 The Future is Wild (June 28, 2010)
 Futz! (September 3, 2007)
 George of the Jungle (June 29, 2007) 
 Gerald McBoing-Boing (August 29, 2005) 
 Grojband (September 5, 2013)
 Harry and His Bucket Full of Dinosaurs3 (March 28, 2005) 
 Hot Wheels Battle Force 5 (September 13, 2009) 
 Iggy Arbuckle (June 29, 2007)
 Inspector Gadget (September 7, 2015)2 (G)
 Jimmy Two-Shoes (February 21, 2009) 
 Joe and Jack (March 1, 2005)
 John Callahan's Quads! (February 2, 2001)
 Johnny Test2 (September 3, 2006) 
 Just Kidding1 (February 3, 2013)
 Kaput and Zösky (September 3, 2002)
 Kid Paddle (September 1, 2003)
 The Kids from Room 402 (August 29, 2000) 
 Knuckleheads (June 6, 2016)
 Life's a Zoo (September 1, 2008) 
 Looped (March 2, 2016) 
 Maggie and the Ferocious Beast3 (August 26, 2000) 
 Majority Rules! (September 10, 2009)
 Marvin the Tap-Dancing Horse3 (September 30, 2000) 
 Matt Hatter Chronicles (September 8, 2012)
 Mega Babies (October 10, 1999) 
 MetaJets (October 3, 2010)
 A Miss Mallard Mystery (September 4, 2000)
 Miss Spider's Sunny Patch Friends3 (September 11, 2004)
 Mudpit (January 5, 2012)
 My Babysitter's a Vampire1 (March 14, 2011)
 My Dad the Rock Star (September 1, 2003)
 My Life Me (September 10, 2011)
 Nanook's Great Hunt 
 Ned's Newt (October 17, 1997) 
 New Tales from the Cryptkeeper (October 10, 1999) 
 Night Sweats (February 29, 2016)
 Olliver's Adventures (September 7, 2002) 
 Packages from Planet X (July 13, 2013) 
 Pecola (September 3, 2001) 
 Pig City (April 16, 2002) 
 Pippi Longstocking (October 17, 1997)
 Pirate Express (April 26, 2015)
 Planet Sketch (November 19, 2005) 
 Potatoes and Dragons (January 5, 2004)
 Punch! (January 11, 2008) 
 Ratz (September 21, 2003) 
 Redwall (September 8, 1999) 
 Rescue Heroes (October 2, 1999)
 Ricky Sprocket: Showbiz Boy (August 31, 2007) 
 RoboRoach (January 8, 2002) 
 Rocket Monkeys (January 10, 2013)
 Silverwing (September 6, 2003)
 Simon in the Land of Chalk Drawings (September 2, 2002)
 Skatoony (October 28, 2010)
 Skyland (November 26, 2005)
 Sons of Butcher (August 5, 2005) 
 Splat!
 Spliced (April 1, 2010) 
 Spider Riders (March 25, 2006) (C8)
 Station X (September 3, 2005)
 Stoked (June 25, 2009)
 Super Dinosaur (September 8, 2018)
 Toad Patrol (October 2, 1999) 
 The Tofus (September 6, 2004)
 ToonMarty (May 1, 2017)
 Total Drama Action 
 Total Drama All-Stars 
 Total Drama: Pahkitew Island 
 Total Drama: Revenge of the Island 
 Total Drama World Tour 
 Totally Spies! (September 2, 2002)
 Undergrads (April 1, 2001) 
 Untalkative Bunny (April 15, 2001) (
 W (July 12, 2006)
 Wayside (March 16, 2007) 
 What About Mimi? (March 6, 2000) 
 What's with Andy? (June 30, 2001) 
 Winston Steinburger and Sir Dudley Ding Dong (January 2, 2017)
 World of Quest (August 10, 2008)
 Yakkity Yak (January 4, 2003) 
 Zeroman (September 11, 2004) 
 The Zimmer Twins (March 14, 2005)

Acquired from Cartoon Network/Boomerang/HBO Max/Adult Swim (U.S.)

 12 oz. Mouse (September 1, 2006) (18+)
 Adventure Time (March 20, 2011) (PG)
 Apple & Onion
 Aqua Teen Hunger Force (January 4, 2004) (14+)
 Aquaman: King of Atlantis (October 15, 2021)
 Assy McGee (September 3, 2007) (18+)
 Baby Blues (September 8, 2002) (PG)
 Baby Looney Tunes
 The Batman (November 6, 2004) (PG)
 Batman: The Brave and the Bold (C8)
 Ben 10 (2005) (C8)
 Ben 10 (2016) (C8)
 Ben 10: Alien Force (September 6, 2008) (C8)
 Ben 10: Omniverse (September 22, 2012) (C8)
 Ben 10: Ultimate Alien (September 12, 2010) (C8)
 Beware the Batman
 Be Cool, Scooby-Doo! (October 8, 2015)
 The Boondocks (February 17, 2006) (18+)
 The Brak Show (September 12, 2004) (PG)
 Bunnicula
 Camp Lazlo (G)
 Chowder (September 6, 2008)
 Clarence (September 4, 2014)
 Codename: Kids Next Door (G)
 Courage the Cowardly Dog (September 7, 2002) (C8)
 Cow and Chicken (G)
 Dexter's Laboratory (G)
 Dorothy and the Wizard of Oz
 DreamWorks Dragons
 Duck Dodgers (G)
 Ed, Edd n Eddy (September 7, 2002) (G)
 Ellen's Acres (February 2007)
 Elliott from Earth (April 4, 2021)
 Evil Con Carne (PG)
 Foster's Home for Imaginary Friends (March 11, 2005) (G)
 Frisky Dingo (September 4, 2007) (18+)
 Generator Rex (January 9, 2011)
 Green Lantern: The Animated Series
 Grim & Evil (September 2, 2002) (PG)
 The Grim Adventures of Billy & Mandy (PG)
 Harvey Birdman, Attorney at Law (March 7, 2003) (18+; modern airings would be 14+)
 The High Fructose Adventures of Annoying Orange 
 Hole in the Wall
 Home Movies (18+; modern airings would be PG)
 Incredible Crew (January 28, 2013)
 Infinity Train (September 23, 2019)
 Jellystone! (October 10, 2021)
 Johnny Bravo (G)
 Justice League (PG)
 Justice League Action (PG)
 Lego Nexo Knights (January 8, 2016)
 Legends of Chima
 Level Up (July 7, 2012)
 The Life and Times of Juniper Lee
 Looney Tunes Cartoons (October 11, 2020)
 The Looney Tunes Show (September 5, 2011)
 Lucy, Daughter of the Devil (September 3, 2008) (18+)
 Mad (PG)
 Mao Mao: Heroes of Pure Heart (September 6, 2019)
 The Marvelous Misadventures of Flapjack
 Megas XLR (September 11, 2004) (C8)
 Metalocalypse (September 3, 2007) (18+)
 Mike, Lu & Og (G)
 Minoriteam (September 6, 2007) (18+)
 Mixels
 Moral Orel (September 4, 2007) (18+)
 ¡Mucha Lucha!
 My Gym Partner's a Monkey
 New Looney Tunes (November 6, 2015)
 O Canada
 The Oblongs (18+; modern airings would be 14+)
 OK K.O.! Let's Be Heroes
 Out of Jimmy's Head (September 6, 2008)
 Perfect Hair Forever (September 5, 2007) (14+)
 The Powerpuff Girls 
 The Powerpuff Girls (2016)
 Rick and Morty (September 3, 2017) (18+)
 Robot Chicken (September 1, 2006) (18+)
 Saul of the Mole Men (May 16, 2009) (14+)
 Scooby-Doo and Guess Who? (October 4, 2019)
 Scooby-Doo! Mystery Incorporated
 Sealab 2021 (September 5, 2007) (14+)
 Secret Mountain Fort Awesome (January 12, 2013)
 The Secret Saturdays 
 Sheep in the Big City (September 2, 2002)
 Space Ghost Coast to Coast (September 1, 2006) (PG)
 Squidbillies (September 1, 2006) (14+)
 Squirrel Boy (September 8, 2007)
 Star Wars: Clone Wars 
 Star Wars: The Clone Wars (September 7, 2009)
 Steven Universe (November 11, 2013)
 Steven Universe Future (December 15, 2019)
 Stroker & Hoop (September 1, 2006) (14+)
 Summer Camp Island (August 13, 2018)
 The Super Hero Squad Show
 Sym-Bionic Titan 
 Teen Titans 
 ThunderCats
 ThunderCats Roar (February 23, 2020)
 Tim and Eric Awesome Show, Great Job! (June 1, 2012) (18+)
 Time Squad (September 5, 2002) (PG)
 Tom Goes to the Mayor (September 1, 2006) (18+)
 Tom and Jerry in New York (September 18, 2021)
 The Tom and Jerry Show (March 1, 2014)
 Tom and Jerry Special Shorts (April 18, 2021)
 Transformers: Cyberverse (September 16, 2018)
 Transformers: Robots in Disguise (March 21, 2015)
 Uncle Grandpa
 Unikitty! (March 17, 2018)
 The Venture Bros. (March 13, 2005) (14+)
 Victor and Valentino (June 1, 2019)
 Wacky Races (2017)
 Whatever Happened to... Robot Jones?
 What's New, Scooby-Doo?
 Xavier: Renegade Angel (May 17, 2009) (18+)
 Yabba-Dabba Dinosaurs (September 5, 2020)

Other acquired programming

 2 Stupid Dogs (1997)
 The 13 Ghosts of Scooby-Doo 
 1001 Nights
 A Pup Named Scooby-Doo
 Ace Ventura: Pet Detective
 The Addams Family 
 The Adventures of Teddy Ruxpin 
 The Adventures of Tintin
 Albert the Fifth Musketeer
 Alien Racers 
 Alvin and the Chipmunks
 ALVINNN!!! and the Chipmunks (September 9, 2015)
 American Dad! (September 1, 2008) (14+)
 Angelo Rules (June 2010)
 Angry Birds Toons (March 16, 2013)
 Angry Kid (14+)
 Animalia
 Animaniacs (1993)
 Apollo's Pad
 Archer (October 17, 2010) (18+)
 Archie's Weird Mysteries
 Astro Boy
 Avengers Assemble 
 The Avengers: Earth's Mightiest Heroes
 The Avengers: United They Stand
 The Awesomes (September 4, 2014)
 Axe Cop
 The Babaloos (C)
 Batman: The Animated Series (PG)
 Beyblade: Metal Masters
 Beyblade Metal Saga
 Beyond Human (September 9, 2011)
 Big Bag (1997)
 Bill & Ted's Excellent Adventures (March 15, 1998)
 Birdz
 Blazing Dragons (1997)
 Blazing Teens
 Bobobo-bo Bo-bobo
 Bob's Burgers (September 7, 2015) (PG; modern airings would be 14+)
 Bolts and Blip (June 28, 2010)
 Bratz
 The Brothers Flub
 The Bugs Bunny & Tweety Show (September 2, 2002) (G)
 Bureau of Alien Detectors
 Butt-Ugly Martians (C8)
 Cadillacs and Dinosaurs
 Captain Star (1997) (G)
 Cardcaptors (2000)
 Chaotic (March 16, 2007)
 Chaotic: Secrets of the Lost City
 The Cleveland Show (September 1, 2018) (14+)
 Clerks: The Animated Series
 Coconut Fred's Fruit Salad Island 
 Code Monkeys (September 4, 2008) (14+)
 Crocadoo (1997)
 Cromartie High School
 The Critic (September 3, 2008) (PG)
 Cyborg 009
 Dan Vs.
 Dilbert (PG)
 Dinofroz 
 Diabolik
 Dog City 
 Domo
 Dr. Katz, Professional Therapist (PG)
 Dragon Ball Z (13 episodes, 1997)
 Dragons: Defenders of Berk
 Drawn Together (18+)
 Duckman (1997) (18+; modern airings would be 14+)
 DuckTales
 Extreme Ghostbusters
 Family Guy (September 1, 2003) (14+)
 Fantastic Four
 Fat Albert and the Cosby Kids
 Father of the Pride (September 5, 2008) (14+)
 Fireball XL5
 The Flintstones (1997)
 Frame by Frame (1997)
 Freakazoid!
 Futurama (September 2, 2002) (14+)
 Future Card Buddyfight 
 G.I. Joe: Renegades (January 9, 2011)
 Gadget & the Gadgetinis (November 2002)
 The Game of Life (September 9, 2012)
 Get Ace (September 8, 2015)
 Gogs
 Goosebumps
 Gordon the Garden Gnome
 Gormiti (2008) (January 2010)
 Gormiti (2018) (April 5, 2019)
 Great Teacher Onizuka
 Guano!
 The Hallo Spencer Show
 Hanazuki: Full of Treasures 
 Happy Tree Friends
 The Haunting Hour: The Series
 The Head (14+)
 Hero Factory (May 23, 2011)
 Hey Joel (PG)
 Highlander: The Animated Series (1997)
 Histeria!
 Home Things (C)
 Hot Wheels: AcceleRacers
 Hulk and the Agents of S.M.A.S.H.
 Immortal Grand Prix (November 2003)
 Iron Man: Armored Adventures 
 Ivanhoe: The King's Knight
 The Jetsons (September 6, 2004)
 Jonny Quest (1997)
 Josie and the Pussycats (1997)
 Journey to the West – Legends of the Monkey King  (2000)
 Kaijudo (September 8, 2012)
 Kappa Mikey
 Kassai and Leuk
 King of the Hill (September 7, 2009) (PG; modern airings would be 14+)
 Kirby: Right Back at Ya! 
 Kong: The Animated Series
 Larva
 The Legend of Calamity Jane
 League of Super Evil
 Lego City Adventures
 Lego Star Wars: The Freemaker Adventures 
 Lego Star Wars: The Yoda Chronicles
 Little People (C)
 Little Robots (March 2003) 
 The Little Lulu Show (May 6, 2006)
 Locodol
 Loonatics Unleashed 
 LoliRock 
 Looney Tunes (1997)
 Lucas Bros. Moving Co. (October 24, 2016)
 Macross Plus
 The Magic School Bus (C)
 Major Lazer (October 24, 2016)
 Man vs. Cartoon
 Martian Successor Nadesico 
 Masha and the Bear
 Moomin (November 1, 1997)
 Max Steel (2000) (C8)
 Max Steel (2013) 
 The Maxx (14+)
 Matt's Monsters (April 5, 2013)
 MegaMan NT Warrior
 Mega Man Star Force (November 2007)
 The Mighty Hercules
 Mighty Max (March 10, 2001)
 Mission Hill (18+; modern airings would be 14+)
 Monster Farm
 The Mouse and the Monster
 Mysticons
 Mythic Warriors: Guardians of the Legend
 Nanook
 Napoleon Dynamite (PG)
 NASCAR Racers
 The New Scooby and Scrappy-Doo Show
 The New Scooby-Doo Movies 
 Night Hood
 Ninja Scroll
 Ninja Senshi Tobikage
 The Nudnik Show
 Numb Chucks
 Oh No! It's an Alien Invasion (November 3, 2014)
 Outlaw Star
 Overachieving the Overrated
 Ozzy & Drix
 Patrol 03
 Pet Alien (2005)
 Phantom Investigators (September 7, 2002)
 Pink Panther and Pals
 Pinky and the Brain 
 Poochini (2000)
 Police Academy
 Pond Life (1997) (14+)
 Popeye the Sailor (1997)
 Power Players (September 1, 2019)
 Power Rangers
 Power Rangers Beast Morphers (May 11, 2019)
 Power Rangers Dino Charge
 Power Rangers Dino Fury (March 13, 2021)
 Power Rangers Dino Super Charge (February 6, 2016)
 Power Rangers Ninja Steel
 Power Rangers Super Megaforce
 The Prince of Tennis
 Princess Natasha
 Princess Sissi
 Rainbow Fish
 Rave Master
 The Real Ghostbusters (C8)
 Redbeard
 Rex the Runt
 The Richard Pryor Show
 Rick & Steve: The Happiest Gay Couple in All the World (18+)
 Right Now Kapow (June 7, 2018)
 The Ripping Friends (C8; modern airings would be PG)
 The Road Runner Show (1997) (C; modern airings would be G)
 Road Rovers
 Robin
 Robinson Sucroe (G)
 Rocket Robin Hood
 Ronin Warriors
 Roughnecks: Starship Troopers Chronicles
 Rurouni Kenshin
 Sabrina: The Animated Series (1999)
 Sabrina's Secret Life
 Santo Bugito (1997)
 Savage Dragon 
 The Scooby-Doo Show
 Scooby-Doo, Where Are You! (1997)
 The Secret Files of the Spy Dogs
 The Secret World of Santa Claus
 Shaggy & Scooby-Doo Get a Clue! (September 8, 2007)
 Shaun the Sheep 
 Silver Surfer (PG)
 The Simpsons (1997) (14+)
 The Smoggies 
 The Smoking Gun
 Smoking Gun TV (14+)
 The Smurfs 
 Sonic Underground (1998)
 Sooty's Amazing Adventures
 Space Goofs (1997)
 The Spectacular Spider-Man (September 7, 2008)
 Spicy City (18+)
 Spider-Man (PG) 
 Spider-Man Unlimited (December 1999) (PG)
 Spy Groove (14+)
 Star Trek: The Animated Series
 Stone Quackers
 Storm Hawks
 Stressed Eric 
 SWAT Kats: The Radical Squadron
 The Sylvester & Tweety Mysteries
 Taz-Mania
 Top Cat (1997)
 Teenage Mutant Ninja Turtles (2003) (C8)
 Teenage Mutant Ninja Turtles (2012)
 Tenkai Knights
 The Tick (PG)
 Tiny Toon Adventures
 Tin and Zig
 Todd McFarlane's Spawn (18+)
 Tom and Jerry
 Tom & Jerry Kids
 The Tom and Jerry Show (1975)
 Tom and Jerry Tales
 Transformers
 Transformers: Prime (January 9, 2011)
 Transformers: Rescue Bots
 Transformers: Rescue Bots Academy (January 13, 2019)
 The Triplets (C)
 Tripping the Rift (14+)
 Turning Mecard (May 28, 2017)
 Twipsy
 Ultimate Spider-Man (September 7, 2012)
 Upstairs, Downstairs Bears (C)
 Voltron Force
 Voltron: The Third Dimension
 Wacky Races (1968)
 Wait Till Your Father Gets Home (September 6, 2004)
 Wild C.A.T.s
 Wild Grinders
 The Wind in the Willows
 Wolverine and the X-Men (PG)
 The Wrong Coast (14+)
 X-Men
 X-Men: Evolution
 Xyber 9: New Dawn
 The Yogi Bear Show (1997) (G)
 Young Robin Hood
 Yu-Gi-Oh! Arc-V (July 24, 2015)
 Yu-Gi-Oh! Zexal (May 4, 2014)
 Yu-Gi-Oh! VRAINS (September 1, 2018)

C = Specifically designed for young children, 8 years and below. Safe programming for all ages.

G = Intended for a broad, general audience. While not necessarily designed for children, any elements aimed at older viewers will be very occasional and mindfully discreet so as to be appropriate viewing for the whole family.

C8 = Intended for older children, 8 years and above. Contains low intensity violence or thematic elements that are more suitable for viewers who can distinguish between fiction and reality.

PG = Parental discretion/co-viewing recommended for viewers under 13. Designed for a general audience, but ultimately geared towards the older viewers in that spectrum. Contains one or more of the following: Moderate mature themes, moderate language, moderate violence, moderate sexual content/nudity.

14+ = Not intended for viewers under 14. Designed specifically for viewers who have developed the psychological perspective needed to comprehend/process more impactful programs. Contains one or more of the following: Intense mature themes, strong language, intense violence, more overt sexual content/nudity.

18+ = Intended for adult viewing only. Contains one or more of the following: explicit themes, hyper-realistic violence, graphic language or explicit sexual content/nudity.

Programming blocks
 Original blocks – Initially, Teletoon's programming was divided into dayparted blocks, each featuring a different style of animation. Each blocks were represented as planets: Morning Planet for Preschoolers (claymation animation; 5:00 a.m. -3:00 p.m. EST), Afternoon Planet for Kids (2D cel animation; 3:00 p.m.- 6:00 p.m.), Evening Planet for Family (collage animation; 6:00 p.m. - 9:00 p.m. EST) and Night Planet for Adult (papier-mâché animation; 9:00 p.m. - 5:00 a.m. EST). The bumpers were made by Cuppa Coffee Studios. This branding would be discontinued in August 1998.
 Teletoon Retro – Teletoon Retro was the branding and block for classic animated programming. It was later spun into a digital channel, which also featured several live-action series. The channel launched on October 1, 2007, and closed on September 1, 2015.
 Can't Miss Thursdays – A block for first-run programming premieres that aired on Thursday nights. The block later featured live-action, hosted segments.
 Superfan Fridays – A block showcasing comic book-related and action-oriented animated series.

See also
 Nelvana
 List of programs broadcast by Treehouse TV
 List of programs broadcast by YTV

References

Teletoon